At least two vessels of the Royal Navy have borne the name HMS Curieux, from the French word for "curious":

  was an 18-gun brig-sloop, the French Navy's corvette Curieux, launched in 1800, captured by the Royal Navy in 1804, and wrecked in 1809.
  was the French Navy's brig Béarnais, launched in 1808, that the Royal Navy captured in 1809, laid up in ordinary in 1810, and sold in 1814.

Royal Navy ship names